State Route 146 (SR 146) is a relatively short north–south highway in Middle Tennessee. The road begins northwest of Centertown and ends in Smithville.

Route description 

SR 146 begins in Cannon County at an intersection with U.S. 70S/SR 1 in the Bluewing community. It proceeds northward as Short Mountain Road, passing through the community of Center Hill, where it intersects SR 281. It continues north through farmland along the southeastern edge of the Highland Rim and turns east, then northeast as it moves around Short Mountain. After passing Short Mountain, SR 146 goes into DeKalb County as Short Mountain Highway, continuing northeast through Bluhmtown. It serves as the southern terminus of SR 83 before entering Smithville. Once in Smithville, SR 146 widens to four lanes with a center turn lane and becomes known as South Mountain Street. It continues northward through neighborhoods before entering a business district and coming to its northern terminus at U.S. 70/SR 26 just south of downtown.

This section was de-designated as SR 146 when U.S. 70S was moved further north along a new four-lane alignment.

Major intersections

See also

References 

146
Transportation in Cannon County, Tennessee
Transportation in DeKalb County, Tennessee